The Geleenbeek is a river in Limburg, the Netherlands. Its source is near the village Benzenrade, part of the city of Heerlen. It flows generally northwest, along Nuth, Schinnen, Spaubeek, turns north at Geleen, flows through the centre of Sittard, and further north through Nieuwstadt until it flows into a branch of the Meuse at Stevensweert.

Its Latin name is "Glana", which means "bright brook".

References

Rivers of the Netherlands
Rivers of Limburg (Netherlands)
Rivers of South Limburg (Netherlands)
Echt-Susteren
Heerlen
Maasgouw
Sittard-Geleen